Agaltara is a genus of tiger moths in the family Erebidae. It contains the single species Agaltara nebulosa, which is found in Malawi and Rwanda. Both the genus and species were first described by Hervé de Toulgoët in 1979.

References

Nyctemerina
Erebid moths of Africa
Monotypic moth genera
Moths described in 1979